The Calgary Dinos women's ice hockey team represented the University of Calgary in the 2010–11 CIS women's ice hockey season. The head coach is former Olympic gold medallist Danielle Goyette. She is assisted by another former Olympic gold medallist Kelly Bechard, Alison Goodman, and Logan Frison. For the season, the Dinos had 18 wins, 8 losses and 3 ties. Their conference record was 16-6-2.

News and notes
Sept. 16, 2010: Hayley Wickenheiser announced that she would return to the University of Calgary to complete her Kinesiology degree. She also announced that she would join the Dinos women's hockey team.
March 16, 2011: Local philanthropist Joan Snyder donated $500,000 to the creation of the Joan Snyder Program of Excellence, the first of its kind in Canada. It will fund the Dinos through the 2015-16 season. All home games will move from the Olympic Oval to the Father David Bauer Arena.
Wickenheiser appeared in only 15 of 24 games due to injury and commitments with Team Canada. She tied for the conference scoring lead with 40 points and led Canada West with 17 goals on the season. Her 2.67 points-per-game average led CIS hockey. She recorded four short-handed goals on the year along with five game-winners and finished with a +22 rating. She led Canada West in all of these categories, respectively. She is the first Dino in program history to be named the Canada West MVP and the first conference all-star since the 2000 season.
March 9, 2011: As a first-year forward for the University of Calgary, Hayley Wickenheiser was named the Canadian Interuniversity Sport player of the year in women's hockey. She then became the first ever Dino to win the Brodrick Trophy as CIS MVP.

Regular season
October 8:Hayley Wickenheiser played in her first CIS game with the Dinos. She earned first star honours and had two goals and one assist.
November 12: Manitoba player Becca King scored the game-winning goal as Manitoba beat the Dinos by a 3-2 mark.
November 13: Amanda Tapp had 32 saves and Erika Mitschke scored the game-winning goal as the Dinos bested the Manitoba Bisons at the Olympic Oval in Calgary.

Schedule

Player stats

Postseason
Canada West Playoffs

Awards and honors
Jenna Smith, Hockey West Rookie of the Year
Hayley Wickenheiser, First Star of Game (October 8)
Wickenheiser was named the Canada West female athlete of the week on November 2, 2010 after scoring three goals and adding an assist in two games against the University of Alberta.
Hayley Wickenheiser, 2011 Canada West Player of the Year
Hayley Wickenheiser, 2011 Brodrick Trophy

Canada West All-Stars

References

Calgary Dinos Women's Ice Hockey Season, 2010-11
Calgary
University of Calgary
Calgary Dinos